Meru is a town in eastern Kenya. It is the headquarters of the Meru County, and the seventh largest urban centre in the country. Meru forms a municipal council with a population of 240,900 residents.

Overview

The town is located at 0.047035 degrees north and 37.649803 degrees east, on the northeast slopes of Mount Kenya. The Kathita River passes adjacent to the town. The main administrative part of the town is on the north side of the Kathita River. While the south side of the river is where residential areas are situated. Meru Town is situated about 8 km north of the equator, at an altitude of approximately 1500 m, in an area of mixed forest and clearings, small towns, villages and rural farms. The town is predominantly populated by the Ameru people, a Bantu ethnic group. In addition there are other people having different and diverse religions, cultures and all walks of life who live, trade and work in this agricultural and commercial town.

History
Meru town's first District Commissioner was Edward Butler Horne. The Meru nicknamed him Kangangi, meaning the little wanderer due to his short stature and the fact that he traveled around Meru a lot as he surveyed the District. This was at a time when the Meru community lived a fairly settled life in ridge-top communities. The City's foundation in its present location was as a result of the military limitations of E. B. Horne's original camp at Mwitari's (homestead).

In 1912, according to Madeleine Laverne Platts, wife of W. A. F. Platts, Meru's first Assistant District Commissioner:
 
"Short [E. B.] Horne had laid out a nice little golf course. 500 local girls were paid to cut the grass by plucking it out with their fingers. Next to the golf course stood a large, handsome log house, in which the door opened to reveal mud floors on which a large hat-stand stood gaunt and proud within a pool of water."
As E.B. Horne was settling in Meru, Methodist leaders were seeking expansion. John B. Griffiths, a Welshman minister previously working at the Kenya coast, petitioned the colonial government to grant the entire Embu region to the Methodists as an exclusive religious sphere. The request was denied because the government considered it unsafe. Griffiths then applied a second time, requesting that the comparatively "peaceful" Meru district be regarded as the exclusive sphere of the United Methodist church. In December 1909 the government agreed.
Griffiths's party arrived at "Fort Meru" in October 1909, to be met by E. B. Horne who allotted the Methodists a plot of land at Ka-Aga. This was then a spirit forest, known to the Meru as the “place of curse removers [Aga]”, less than two miles north east of his new administrative headquarters.

Griffiths's subsequent report of his expedition described Meru as a land of "hills, valleys, and innumerable streams." 
He found it
"unlike any other area in Africa: Its hills are covered with ferns, hedges are thick with blackberry bushes, and in the streams watercress abounds . . . [and] mosquitoes are unknown. . . . We have been toiling for fifty years in the sweltering climate of the coast, contending with tremendous difficulties, bitter disappointments and deaths. We have been for years meditating upon seeking another and better country in which our men can live and labor and reap. SIR, HERE IT IS. THE FUTURE OF OUR EAST AFRICAN MISSION LIES HERE. I implore the committee to enter it”.
In January 1912 he and Griffiths and a Reverend Frank Mimmack occupied the allotted site and begun construction of the first buildings. They were later joined by Rev. Reginald T. Worthington. This site in Kaaga has grown to be Meru's Education Centre, with a National School, A leading school for students with special needs, two provincial schools and two Primary schools.

In 1956, The Methodist Mission approached the Meru County Council and requested to be allotted land. Their request was granted and they were allotted 50 acres of land where they established the Methodist Training Institute in 1958. This institute grew over the years and merged with two other colleges to become The Kenya Methodist University.

Climate
Meru has a cool subtropical highland climate (Csb) with heavy rainfall from March to May and from October to December. It has little rainfall in January and February and from June to September.

Transport
The town of Meru is linked to Nairobi by a tarmac road named B6, from the south around the east side of Mount Kenya, via Embu, or from the northwest around the west and north side of Mount Kenya, via Nanyuki and Timau. An international airport is situated at Isiolo, 35 Kilometres away, via a new tarmac road through Ruiri. Within the town, the roads have seen a lot of improvement after the maintenance of urban roads was transferred to the Kenya Urban Roads Authority, which in turn set up its Upper Eastern Regional Headquarters in Meru.

Tourism and hospitality
Meru town is a jumping-off place for Samburu and Buffalo Springs National Reserves and Lewa Conservancy, all some distance north of Meru, with Samburu and Buffalo Springs via Isiolo, and Meru National Park, to the northeast of Meru, via Maua in the Nyambene Hills.

The Meru Museum is housed in Meru's first District Commissioner's Office, built by E. B. Horne. It preserves the historical and cultural artifacts of the Meru people.

It is at Rutundu log cabins 20 Kilometre west of Meru City that Prince William proposed to the Duchess of Cambridge. The Meru side of Mt. Kenya National Park has tourist attractions of worth which include Vivvien Falls, Semwe Salt lick, Ithanguni, Lake Alice, Lake Ellis and Sacred Lake.

Meru has good hotels and restaurants. They include:
The Alba
Karimba Lodge
The Elsa
Paramount Hotel
Blue Towers Hotel
White Star Hotel
Hotel Three Steers
Meru Safari Hotel
Royal Prince Restaurant
Simba Wells
Brown Rock Hotel
La Vienna Restaurant
Nevada Hotel
West Wind hotel
ShadeNet Hotel
Gatimene Springs
All Smiles Hotel
Thiiri Centre
Meru Slopes
Meru Guest Villas
Rangeland Hotels & Campsite – Buuri District
Paradise Hill Gardens
Heritage hotel (Nkubu)
Aspire Catering and Events offers outside catering services in the region
Chandy Leisure Gardens

Commerce
Meru town is the Commercial capital of Northern and Eastern Kenya. It hosts a Central Bank of Kenya’s Currency Centre serving the North Eastern Half of Kenya. Meru has 22 bank branches. Kenya's Banks, Equity, Postbank, Barclays, Standard Chartered Co-Operative, Diamond Trust, National Bank and Family Bank, CBA, Fina Bank, K-rep Bank, Eco-BAnk, CFC stanbic, NIC, Housing Finance, KCB, Bank of Baroda, have branches in the town while several micro-finance institutions are also available. Mwalimu Cooperative Savings & Credit Society Limited, (Mwalimu Sacco), the largest Sacco in Kenya, maintains a branch in Meru. The town is the business and agricultural centre for north-eastern Kenya.

Education
Meru town is an educational centre for the northeast of Kenya. There are many primary and secondary schools, including the Meru Primary, Meru School, Kaaga Girls, Kaaga Boys just to name a few. There are also technical schools, the Meru Technical Institute being the major one. There are also teacher training colleges, campuses of various universities including Egerton, Nairobi, among others. Its main universities are, Meru University College of Science and Technology (MUCST) and Kenya Methodist University, both of which have their main campus within and near Meru town.

Some other institutions of higher learning in Meru town include:

Kenya Medical Training College, Meru Campus
Meru Technical Training Institute
Nkabune Technical Institute
Africa Nazarene University, Meru Campus
University of Nairobi Extra Mural Centre situated in the Posta Building
Kenya Institute of Management – Alexander House
Kenya Methodist University – Main Campus

Meru County also has both public and private schools. However, some children are orphaned and vulnerable hence cannot access formal education. NGOs such as Ripples International campaigns for the protection of such children. It also has a model primary school called the Nahal Academy.

References 

Meru County
Populated places in Eastern Province (Kenya)
County capitals in Kenya